Jonesoceras is a genus of orthocerids from the Silurian of Bohemia named by Barscov, 1960, included in the Geisonoceratidae. Also named by him, from the same age and area,  the related Joachimoceras and Temperoceras.

References

 Walter C Sweet. 1964. Nautiloidea-Orthocerida; Treatise on Invertebrate Paleontology, Part K (incl Nautiloidea). Geological Society of America and University of Kansas Press

Prehistoric nautiloid genera
Orthocerida